Air Turquoise was a low-cost airline based in France. It operated services to Marseille, Nice and Bordeaux from Reims Champagne Airport. The airline was liquidated on 2 August 2006.

History
The airline was founded on 21 June 2005. It flew a single 44-seat ATR 42-500 (D-BRRR). On 28 June 2006 the airline moved its operations from Reims airport to Vatry International Airport. The airline experienced financial problems and all flights were suspended from 19 July 2006 onwards, followed by liquidation. Its operational capacity was retained until 31 July, in the hope that a new investor would come forward. On 2 August 2006, the company ceased its activities.

Destinations
Air Turquoise flew to the following destinations:
Bordeaux (Aéroport de Bordeaux Mérignac)
London (London Luton Airport)
Marseille (Marseille Provence Airport)
Nice (Côte d'Azur International Airport)
Reims (Vatry International Airport) HUB
Toulouse (Toulouse Blagnac International Airport)

References

Defunct airlines of France
Airlines established in 2005
Airlines disestablished in 2006